David Riley may refer to:
 Dave Riley (1960–2019), American musician
 David Riley (American football) (born 1967)
 David Riley (footballer) (born 1960), English soccer player
 David Riley (politician) (died 1901), American politician and physician